Talking About Detective Fiction is a book written by P. D. James and published by Knopf Doubleday (owned by Penguin Random House) on 1 December 2009. It won the Anthony Award for Best Critical Non-Fiction in 2010.

External links 
 Mysteries of Crime Fiction? P. D. James Is on the Case
 Talking About Detective Fiction by PD James – review
 A Few Clues From a Master: Notes on Arthur Conan Doyle, Agatha Christie—and Jane Austen
 Talking about Detective Fiction, By PD James
 PD James, Queen of Detective Fiction: Interview

References 

Anthony Award-winning works
2009 non-fiction books